Ross Sheppard (22 November 1888 – 4 September 1967) was a Canadian athlete and educator. He competed in the men's triple jump at the 1924 Summer Olympics. The Ross Sheppard High School in Edmonton, Alberta, Canada is named after him.

References

External links
 

1888 births
1967 deaths
Athletes (track and field) at the 1924 Summer Olympics
Canadian male triple jumpers
Olympic track and field athletes of Canada
Athletes from Toronto